CBD West Transfer Center is a bus-only station bounded by Lamar, San Jacinto, Griffin and Pacific, near West End Station in Dallas, Texas. It is one of two Downtown Dallas transfer centers owned by DART in the Central Business District. Most of the buses and light rails serve West End, The Sixth Floor Museum at Dealey Plaza, El Centro College, Dallas World Aquarium, as well as the American Airlines Center.

Unlike many transit centers, CBD West Transfer Center does not provide parking; however, it does provide an air conditioned/heated facility daily.

See also
CBD East Transfer Center

References

External links 
Dallas Area Rapid Transit
CBD West Transfer Center

Dallas Area Rapid Transit
Bus stations in Dallas